Asquerosa Alegría is the second album by the Argentine rock band Bersuit Vergarabat, released in 1993.

Track listing
 "Fuera De Aca" [Get Out Of Here] (Cordera, Céspedes) – 4:11
 "Sin Son" (Martín, Righi, Céspedes) – 4:59
 "Tu Pastilla Fue" (Cordera, Martín, Céspedes) – 4:00
 "Clara" (Cordera) – 5:05
 "Cha Cha Cha" (Cordera) – 2:49
 "Ausencia De Estribillo" [Chorus Absence] (Subirá, Céspedes) – 2:35
 "Si Amanece" (Cordera, Céspedes) – 4:22
 "Decile A Tu Mamá" (Quiroga, Cordera) – 2:23
 "Balada De Guang Chang Kein" (Subirá) – 0:46
 "Los Elefantitos" (Cordera, Subirá) [Little Elephants] – 5:14
 "Vamos, No Llegamos" (Cordera, Martín, Céspedes) [Let's Go, We Late] – 3:42
 "Nepore'y (Tu Ausencia)" (Subirá, Céspedes) – 5:48
 "Buceando En El Riachuelo" [Diving In Little River] (Cordera, Céspedes, Gonzalez) – 2:12

1993 albums
Bersuit Vergarabat albums